Mongstad is an industrial site in Vestland county, Norway. The site sits on the border of the municipalities of Alver and Austrheim, with most of the site in Alver. The site features an oil refinery for Equinor and other oil companies, including Shell. The port at Mongstad is the largest in Norway, measured in tonnage. The refinery at Mongstad is modern, and has been extensively upgraded, with a capacity of 12 million tonnes of crude oil per year (230,000 barrels per day). The refinery is the largest in Norway, though medium-sized by European standards. It is owned by a company called Mongstad Refining, in which Equinor has whole ownership (since 2012).

All the crude oil refined at Mongstad comes from the North Sea. The largest production is petrol, diesel, jet fuel, and light petroleum products.  The heaviest components are used to make petrol coke, an important ingredient in anodes for aluminum production.

In 2010, Equinor and Ørsted opened the Mongstad Power Station, a natural gas-fired thermal power plant, to provide the site with heat energy and electricity, as well as power to the Troll gas field.

History
The first use of the site was in 1975, when Statoil opened its refinery.

Statoil built a natural gas-fired thermal power plant at Mongstad in 2010. The carbon dioxide emissions that were predicted to result aroused public controversy as the project was being built.

External links

References

Oil refineries in Norway
Ports and harbours of Norway
Equinor
Norsk Hydro
Alver (municipality)
Austrheim
Oil terminals